The 1999 Enugu State gubernatorial election occurred in Nigeria on January 9, 1999. The PDP nominee Chimaroke Nnamani won the election, defeating the APP candidate.

Chimaroke Nnamani emerged PDP candidate.

Electoral system
The Governor of Enugu State is elected using the plurality voting system.

Primary election

PDP primary
The PDP primary election was won by Chimaroke Nnamani.

Results
The total number of registered voters in the state was 1,466,472. Total number of votes cast was 845,320, while number of valid votes was 842,415. Rejected votes were 3,005.

References 

Enugu State gubernatorial elections
Enugu State gubernatorial election
Enugu State gubernatorial election
Enugu State gubernatorial election